Steve Fualau (born 3 August 1984) is a Samoan rugby union player who currently plays as a hooker for the Melbourne Rebels in Super Rugby.

Career

Fualau has had something of a journeyman career, starting out in New Zealand's South Island with  where he earned 27 caps over the course of 4 years and was also part of the  wider training group in 2008.   He shifted north to join  ahead of the 2012 ITM Cup, however his stay was not a happy one and he left without making any senior appearances.   A shift across the Tasman followed in 2013 and he played Club Rugby for Southern Districts in the New South Wales Shute Shield.

Fualau was not initially named in either the  regular squad or extended playing squad for the 2014 Super Rugby season. He was however brought in to little fanfare as an experienced hand to help out the Melbourne franchise's other hookers, Pat Leafa, Shota Horie and Tom Sexton who between them boasted only 7 super rugby caps prior to the start of the season. He replaced Pat Leafa in the 74th minute as his side recorded a 35-14 victory.

International

Although never capped at full international level, Fualau was a member of the Manu Samoa side which won the 2012 IRB Pacific Nations Cup.

References

1984 births
Living people
Samoan rugby union players
Samoa international rugby union players
Rugby union hookers
Canterbury rugby union players
Auckland rugby union players
Melbourne Rebels players
Expatriate rugby union players in Australia
Expatriate rugby union players in France
AS Béziers Hérault players